Gavril A. Yushvaev (Russian: Гаврил Юшваев; born 1957) is a billionaire Russian oligarch and businessman. He is also an Israeli citizen.

Biography
Gavril Yushvaev was born in Makhachkala, Dagestan.

In 1980, Yushvaev was convicted of robbery and spent nine years in a Soviet prison camp, a fact revealed in a prospectus issued during Yushvaev's subsequent business career.

After getting out of prison in 1989, Yushavev partnered with David Yakobashvili. In 1993, they invested in the Lianozovo Dairy Plant, which would later become Wimm Bill Dann.

Business ventures 
Yushvaev became wealthy in the 1990s as the co-founder of the car dealership Trinity and as the founder of a dance club (Metelitsa) and casino in Moscow. Yushvaev then invested in Wimm-Bill-Dann, a dairy and juice company. The company was founded in 1995 and had its initial public offering in 2002. Yushvaev was the company's largest shareholder. In 2010, Yushvaev sold his 19.6% stake in the company to PepsiCo for $1.1 billion. In 2013, Yushvaev and Zelimkhan Mutsoev purchased a 38% stake in Polyus Gold from Mikhail Prokhorov for $3.6 billion. He sold his stake in Polyus Gold in 2015.  

Yushvaev and Vladislav Doronin also invested $300 million in a large real estate project in Moscow. In 2016, Yushvaev invested $300 million in a real estate project organized by Vladislav Doronin. The developments include an 85 story office block, shopping center and parking space for nearly 4000 cars.
According to Forbes, Yushvaev's net worth in 2022 was about $1.8 billion.

Yushvaev has a holding company in Cyprus.

Personal life

Yushvaev is married and has eight children. He lives in Moscow.

References

Russian oligarchs
1957 births
Living people
Russian billionaires
Russian food industry businesspeople
People from Makhachkala